YUT may refer to:

 Yut, a traditional Korean board game
 Repulse Bay Airport, Canada (IATA Code)